Gifts Differing: Understanding Personality Type is a 1980 book written by Isabel Briggs Myers with Peter B. Myers, which describes the insights into the psychological type model originally developed by C. G. Jung as adapted and embodied in the Myers–Briggs Type Indicator (MBTI) personality test. The book explains the many practical applications of this typological model  using four categories of psychological type differences — Extraversion / Introversion; Sensing / Intuition; Thinking / Feeling; Judging / Perceiving. The book also suggests how different combinations of these characteristics tend to influence the ways people perceive the world and how they both respond to and interact with it. Type tables show how type preferences tend to correlate with occupational interests. Profiles of the sixteen types also suggest how people of each type tend to act and relate to people with other type dynamics.

Every year over 2.5 million people take the MBTI assessment, and it has become the most widely used personality questionnaire in history. Over 150,000 copies of Gifts Differing have been sold.

The late Isabel Briggs Myers devoted her life to the observation, study and measurement of personality and psychological type indicator theory.  With her mother, Katharine Cook Briggs, she developed the Myers–Briggs Type Indicator personality inventory. Her son, Peter B. Myers, continues research work on the development and application of personality type.

See also
 Quiet: The Power of Introverts in a World That Can't Stop Talking

References

Bibliography

Myers, Isabel Briggs with Peter B. Myers, (Original edition 1980; Reprint edition 1995), Gifts Differing: Understanding Personality Type, Davies-Black Publishing, 248 pages, 

Psychology books
Personality typologies
Works about personality